Weiden may refer to:

Places 
In Austria
 Weiden am See in the district of Neusiedl am See in Burgenland
 Weiden bei Rechnitz in the district of Oberwart in the Burgenland
 Weiden an der March in the district of Gänserndorf in Lower Austria

In Germany
 Weiden in der Oberpfalz, a city in Upper Palatinate, Bavaria
 Weiden, Rhineland-Palatinate, in Birkenfeld in Rhineland-Palatinate 
 Part of the Municipality of Kürten in the Rheinisch-Bergischer Kreis in North Rhine-Westphalia
 Weiden, Cologne, part of the city district Lindenthal of Cologne

In Italy
 Udine, former German name of Udine